There are several radio stations with the branding of 98 Rock:
KRXQ in Sacramento, California
WIYY in Baltimore, Maryland
WXTB-FM in Tampa, Florida
KTAL-FM in Shreveport, Louisiana (98 Rocks)

Actual Rocks:
The 98 Rock - A stone on Wake Island marked after a massacre of 98 American POWs by the Japanese